This is the discography of Kirko Bangz, an American rapper, singer and record producer.

Albums

Extended plays

Mixtapes

Singles

As lead artist

As featured artist

Other charted songs

Guest appearances

Notes

References

Discographies of American artists
Hip hop discographies